In jurisprudence, selective prosecution is a procedural defense in which defendants argue that they should not be held criminally liable for breaking the law, as the criminal justice system discriminated against them by choosing to prosecute. In claims of selective prosecution, defendants essentially argue that it is irrelevant whether they are guilty of violating a law, but that the fact of being prosecuted is based upon forbidden reasons. Such a claim might, for example, entail an argument that persons of different age, race, religion, or gender, were engaged in the same illegal acts for which the defendant is being tried and were not prosecuted, and that the defendant is only being prosecuted because of a bias. 

In the United States, this defense is based upon the 14th Amendment, which stipulates, "nor shall any state deny to any person within its jurisdiction the equal protection of the laws." The U.S. Supreme Court has defined the term as: "A selective prosecution claim is not a defense on the merits to the criminal charge itself, but an independent assertion that the prosecutor has brought the charge for reasons forbidden by the Constitution."  The defense is rarely successful; some authorities claim, for example, that there are no reported cases in at least the past century in which a court dismissed a criminal prosecution because the defendant had been targeted based on race. In United States v. Armstrong (1996), the Supreme Court ruled the Attorney General and United States Attorneys "retain 'broad discretion' to enforce the Nation's criminal laws" and that "in the absence of clear evidence to the contrary, courts presume that they have properly discharged their official duties." Therefore, the defendant must present "clear evidence to the contrary", which demonstrates "the federal prosecutorial policy 'had a discriminatory effect and that it was motivated by a discriminatory purpose.'"

See also
Equal protection
Malicious prosecution
Selective enforcement

References

Further reading
David Cole, No Equal Justice (New Press rev. ed. 2008) 
Angela Davis, Arbitrary Justice: The Power of the American Prosecutor (Oxford 2007) 
Cassia Spohn, Samuel Walker & Miriam Delone, The Color of Justice: Race, Ethnicity, and Crime in America (2006) 

Criminal defenses